Anthony Frederick Levin (born June 6, 1946) is an American musician and composer, specializing in electric bass, Chapman Stick and upright bass. He also sings and plays synthesizer. Levin is best known for his work with King Crimson (since 1981) and Peter Gabriel (since 1977). He is also a member of Liquid Tension Experiment (1997–1999, 2008–2009, 2020–present), Bruford Levin Upper Extremities (1998–2000) and HoBoLeMa (2008–2010). He has led his own band, Stick Men, since 2010.

A prolific session musician since the 1970s, Levin has played on over 500 albums. Some notable sessions include work with John Lennon, Sarah McLachlan, Paula Cole, Stevie Nicks, Pink Floyd, Paul Simon, Lou Reed, David Bowie, Joan Armatrading, Tom Waits, Buddy Rich, The Roches, Todd Rundgren, Seal, Warren Zevon, Bryan Ferry, Laurie Anderson, Kate & Anna McGarrigle, Gibonni, and Jean-Pierre Ferland. He toured with artists including Peter Gabriel, Paul Simon (with whom he appeared in the 1980 film One-Trick Pony), Gary Burton, James Taylor, Herbie Mann, Judy Collins, Carly Simon, Peter Frampton, Tim Finn, Richie Sambora, Ivano Fossati, Claudio Baglioni and Lawrence Gowan.

Levin helped to popularize the Chapman Stick and the NS upright bass. He also created "funk fingers", modified drumsticks that attach to the fingers of the player in order to strike the bass strings, adding a distinctive percussive "slap"" sound used in funk bass playing. In 2011, Levin ranked # 2 behind John Paul Jones of Led Zeppelin in the "20 Most Underrated Bass Guitarists" in Paste magazine. In July 2020, Levin was ranked #42 on the "50 Greatest Bassists of All Time" list by Rolling Stone magazine.

Biography

Early life and education 
Anthony Frederick Levin was born on June 6, 1946, in Boston, Massachusetts and grew up in the suburb of Brookline. He began playing double bass at 10 years old, primarily studying classical music. In high school, he learned tuba, soloing with the concert band, and also started a barbershop quartet.

After high school, he attended the Eastman School of Music in Rochester, New York and played in the Rochester Philharmonic Orchestra. Also at Eastman, he studied with drummer Steve Gadd. He traded in his Ampeg electric upright "Baby Bass" for a Fender Precision Bass; in the early days his first bass amplifier was an Ampeg Portaflex B-15.

In 1968, Gap Mangione released his first solo album, Diana in the Autumn Wind, featuring Levin and drummer Steve Gadd in their first recordings, and new compositions and arrangements by Chuck Mangione, who conducted as well.

1970s–1980s 
In 1970, Levin moved to New York City, joining a band called Aha, the Attack of the Green Slime Beast, with Don Preston of The Mothers of Invention. Soon after, he began working as a session musician, and through the 1970s he played bass on many albums, including Buddy Rich's big band jazz album, The Roar of '74, and Paul Simon's Still Crazy After All These Years (1975).

In 1971, John McLaughlin asked Levin to join his new project, the Mahavishnu Orchestra: "My original choice for bass was Tony Levin. But he told me, 'Oh man, I just took a gig with Gary Burton.'"

From 1973 to 1975, Levin and Steve Gadd played in the band of veteran jazz flautist Herbie Mann. Two of Levin's early compositions (“Daffodil” and “Music Is a Game We Play”) were featured on the 1973 Mann album First Light.

In 1976, Levin helped create the lush textures on Andy Pratt's Resolution album, that featured numerous notable musicians including Arif Mardin, Andy Newmark, Hugh McDonald, Luther Vandross and Levin's frequent rhythm section partner Steve Gadd. Allmusic.com and Rolling Stone magazine rated this album as one of the best singer/songwriter albums of the 1970s.

In 1977, Levin joined Peter Gabriel's band. He had met Gabriel through producer Bob Ezrin with whom Levin had recorded Alice Cooper's Welcome to My Nightmare and Lou Reed's Berlin. Levin has been Gabriel's bass player of choice ever since. On Peter's first solo album, Levin played tuba as well, and directed and sang with a barbershop quartet on "Excuse Me".

With the exception of John Giblin's fretless bass playing on Peter Gabriel III, and some additional work by Larry Klein on "In Your Eyes" & "Mercy Street", and Bill Laswell on "This is the Picture" (all three tracks from So), Levin has been the bassist on all of Gabriel's studio sessions and on his many tours around the world.

In his years with Gabriel, Levin developed two unique aspects of his playing: further advancement on the Chapman Stick, which he would later utilize heavily in King Crimson, and the development of funk fingers. First used on the song "Big Time", from Gabriel's 1986 So album, funk fingers are chopped off drumsticks used to hammer on the bass strings. Levin credits Gabriel with the concept and his tech at the time (Andy Moore) with actually making them workable.

In 1978, Levin moved to Woodstock, New York, to join the band L'Image, which included his old friend Steve Gadd as well as Mike Mainieri and Warren Bernhardt. The band broke up after a year, though Levin still decided to stay in the area: he currently resides in Kingston, New York. This Ill-fated group would reunite much later in Levin's career. While recording Peter Gabriel's first album, Levin became acquainted with guitarist Robert Fripp, and in 1978 played on Fripp's solo album, Exposure. This would lead Levin to become a member of the 1981–1984 incarnation of King Crimson, along with Fripp, guitarist/vocalist Adrian Belew and drummer Bill Bruford. Levin recorded four studio albums as part of King Crimson: Discipline (1981), Beat (1982), Three of a Perfect Pair (1984) and THRAK (1995), all critically acclaimed.

In 1980, Levin participated in the sessions for John Lennon and Yoko Ono's Double Fantasy album.

In 1987, Levin played the bass and Chapman Stick parts on Pink Floyd's first album after the departure of Roger Waters, A Momentary Lapse of Reason.

In 1988 Bruford asked Levin to be an "unofficial fifth member" in the Yes related supergroup Anderson Bruford Wakeman Howe, which consisted of all the members from the classic Yes lineup except bassist Chris Squire, but he only functioned as a session player on ABWH's eponymous album. Due to a severe virus, he was unable to play on some of the final dates of the accompanying tour, being replaced by Jeff Berlin. Levin also plays on the Yes album Union from 1991.

In 1984 Levin released Road Photos, a collection of black and white photos taken during his travels with Crimson, Gabriel, Simon, and others. Another book of photos focusing on King Crimson's travels in the 1980s, The Crimson Chronicles volume 1, was released in 2004. There has been no word yet on the release of volume 2, which will cover the 1990s and possibly 2000s versions of the band. Levin has also written a book of career anecdotes and road stories called Beyond the Bass Clef.

Levin was part of King Crimson again from 1994 to 1997 as part of the "Double Trio" line-up of the band which consisted of Levin, Robert Fripp, Adrian Belew, Trey Gunn, Pat Mastelotto, and Bill Bruford. Fripp then reformed King Crimson as a quartet, without Levin and Bruford. Levin also took part in two of the post-breakup experimental sub-groups, ProjeKct One (1997) and ProjeKct Four (1998). Levin played bass on "Watcher of the Skies" from Steve Hackett's Genesis Revisited album (1996). He was very busy in the late 1990s with his own groups Bruford Levin Upper Extremities, Bozzio Levin Stevens and Liquid Tension Experiment. In 2008, Levin joined King Crimson's 40th Anniversary Tour, in a lineup including Fripp, Belew, and drummers Mastelotto and Gavin Harrison (Porcupine Tree).

1990s–2000s 

In 1998, Levin and Bruford formed Bruford Levin Upper Extremities with trumpeter Chris Botti and guitarist David Torn; they released one studio album in 1998 and a live double album in 2000. Torn, Levin, and Bruford had worked with trumpeter Mark Isham, for Torn's album Cloud About Mercury. Former Japan bassist Mick Karn replaced Levin for Isham's tour at the time. Levin also continued recording albums with his own band, consisting of drummer/saxophonist/vocalist Jerry Marotta, guitarist Jesse Gress, synthesizer programmer/player Larry Fast, and Levin's brother, keyboardist Pete Levin. He also regularly played (and occasionally recorded) with the California Guitar Trio when their schedules permitted.

In 1997, Levin teamed up with Mike Portnoy and John Petrucci, members of Dream Theater, as well as future Dream Theater keyboardist Jordan Rudess, for a project called Liquid Tension Experiment. The combo released two albums, Liquid Tension Experiment and Liquid Tension Experiment 2 in 1998 and 1999 respectively, as well as playing short tours in 1998 and 2008. There have also been two CDs of material released under the name "Liquid Trio Experiment"; the first composed of studio jams from the LTE2 sessions without Petrucci (Spontaneous Combustion), released for the band's tenth anniversary, and a live recording from a 2008 Chicago show where Rudess's equipment failed and the other three covered for it with a nearly hour-long improvisation (When the Keyboard Breaks).  During the COVID-19 global pandemic, the group reconvened and recorded a new album for release in April 2021 call LTE3.

At the end of 2003 Trey Gunn left King Crimson and Levin rejoined as the bassist, although the band was only active for a handful of rehearsals at that time and the aforementioned 40th Anniversary tour in the summer of 2008.

In 2006, Levin released Resonator, The first album to feature Levin as a lyricist and lead vocalist.  2007 saw the release of Stick Man, an album of pieces recorded on the Chapman Stick.

In 2009 Levin reunited with his band from 1978, L'Image, featuring Mike Mainieri, Warren Bernhardt, David Spinozza, and Steve Gadd. The group performed at the Iridium Jazz Club in New York City, toured Japan, and released the album L'Image 2.0. In 2010 Levin toured with HoBoLeMa, a group consisting of Allan Holdsworth on guitar, Terry Bozzio on drums, Levin on bass and Pat Mastelotto. All their shows were completely improvised with no written music.

Following on from the Stick Man album, Levin joined up with fellow player Michael Bernier and King Crimson drummer Pat Mastelotto to form the group Stick Men. The band released its first album Soup in 2010. Bernier left the group shortly after the release of Soup and was replaced by touch guitarist Markus Reuter in 2010. This lineup has continued with a busy touring and recording schedule, releasing the EP Absalom in 2011 and the full albums Open (June 2012), and Deep (Sept 2012). 

Levin's brother, Pete Levin, is a New York keyboardist and writer who is known for his work with Gil Evans. In the 1970s, Tony and Pete collaborated with Steve Gadd in the comedy band The Clams. Levin has stated that some of the Clams' material may eventually be released. Levin also played on Jean-Pierre Ferland's Jaune album, which included hits "Le petit roi" and "Le chat du café des artistes".

On September 24, 2013, Levin was officially announced as a member of the 8th incarnation of King Crimson, alongside band founder Robert Fripp, guitarist Jakko Jakszyk, the returning Mel Collins on saxophone, and drummers Pat Mastelotto, Gavin Harrison and new member Bill Rieflin. The group toured the United States in the autumn of 2014 and has continued to tour throughout the world since, including 2019 when King Crimson celebrated its 50th anniversary.

Influence 

Many artists have cited Levin as an influence or have expressed their admiration for him, including Les Claypool of Primus, Colin Hodgkinson, Nick Beggs, Al Barrow of Magnum, Dan Briggs of Between the Buried and Me, Zach Cooper of Coheed and Cambria and Jonathan Hischke of Dot Hacker and El Grupo Nuevo de Omar Rodriguez Lopez.

Personal life 
Levin met Andi Turco in 1995 when she was promoting Virgin Records in Atlanta. They married three years later. Andi Turco-Levin ran for mayor of Kingston, New York, in 2011, and for Ulster County Legislature in 2019, both campaigns unsuccessful. Turco-Levin is credited with backing vocals on the album Resonator (2006) and for photography on Levin Minnemann Rudess (2013).

In 2003, Levin stated that he is a vegetarian.

Discography 
Levin has played on hundreds of recordings as a session musician or a guest artist.
{| class="wikitable sortable"
!Date
!Artists
!Title
|-
|1995
| rowspan="7" |Tony Levin
|World Diary
|-
|2000
|Waters of Eden
|-
|2002
|Pieces of the Sun
|-
|2002
|Double Espresso
|-
|2006
|Resonator
|-
|2007
|Stick Man
|-
|2019
|The Bucket List
|-
|1974
| rowspan="4" |Herbie Mann
|First Light as The Family of Mann
|-
|1976
|Surprises
|-
|1974 [1976]
|Gagaku & Beyond
|-
|1977
|Brazil: Once Again
|-
|1977
| rowspan="11" |Peter Gabriel
|Peter Gabriel (Car)
|-
|1978
|Peter Gabriel (Scratch)
|-
|1980
|Peter Gabriel (Melt)
|-
|1982
|Peter Gabriel (Security)
|-
|1983
|Plays Live
|-
|1985
|Birdy
|-
|1986
|So
|-
|1992
|Us
|-
|1994
|Secret World Live
|-
|2000
|OVO
|-
|2002
|Up
|-
|1981
| rowspan="25" |King Crimson
|Discipline
|-
|1982
|Beat
|-
|1982
|The Noise: Frejus (VHS) / Neal and Jack and Me (DVD)
|-
|1984
|Three of a Perfect Pair
|-
|1984
|Three of a Perfect Pair: Live in Japan (VHS) / Neal and Jack and Me (DVD)
|-
|1998
|Absent Lovers: Live in Montreal
|-
|1994
|Vrooom
|-
|1995
|THRAK
|-
|1995
|B'Boom: Live in Argentina
|-
|1996
|Thrakattak
|-
|1996
|Live in Japan (VHS) / Déjà Vrooom (DVD) / The Collectable King Crimson Volume Five (Live in Japan 1995 – The Official Edition)
|-
|1999
|Live in Mexico City
|-
|2001
|Vrooom Vrooom
|-
|1999
|The ProjeKcts
|-
|1999
|The Deception of the Thrush: A Beginners' Guide to ProjeKcts
|-
|2012
|Live in Argentina, 1994 (DVD-A)
|-
|2014–2017
|The Elements of King Crimson
|-
|2015
|Live at the Orpheum
|-
|2015
|Live EP 2014 (Vinyl Cyclops Picture Disc)
|-
|2016
|Live In Toronto
|-
|2016
|Radical Action to Unseat the Hold of Monkey Mind
|-
|2017
|Heroes – Live In Europe (2016)
|-
|2017
|Live In Chicago (2017 – Chicago Theater)
|-
|2018
|Live in Vienna (2016 – Museumsquartier)
|-
|2018
|Meltdown: Live in Mexico City (2017 – Teatro Metropólitan)
|-
|1989
| rowspan="2" |Anderson Bruford Wakeman Howe
|Anderson Bruford Wakeman Howe
|-
|2012
|Live at the NEC
|-
|1991
|Yes
|Union
|-
| rowspan="2" |1997
|Gorn, Levin, Marotta
|From the Caves of the Iron Mountain
|-
| rowspan="2" |Bozzio Levin Stevens
|Black Light Syndrome
|-
|2000
|Situation Dangerous
|-
|1998
|ProjeKct One
|Live at the Jazz Café
|-
|1999
|ProjeKct Four
|West Coast Live
|-
|2007
|Liquid Trio Experiment
|Spontaneous Combustion
|-
|1998
| rowspan="3" |Liquid Tension Experiment
|Liquid Tension Experiment
|-
|1999
|Liquid Tension Experiment 2
|-
|2021
|Liquid Tension Experiment 3
|-
| rowspan="4" |2009
|Liquid Trio Experiment 2
|When the Keyboard Breaks: Live in Chicago
|-
| rowspan="3" |Liquid Tension Experiment
|Liquid Tension Experiment Live 2008 – Limited Edition Boxset
|-
|Liquid Tension Experiment Live in NYC
|-
|Liquid Tension Experiment Live in LA
|-
|1998
| rowspan="2" |Bruford Levin Upper Extremities
|Bruford Levin Upper Extremities
|-
|2000
|B.L.U.E. Nights
|-
|2008
| rowspan="2" |Steven Wilson
|Insurgentes (Kscope) on tracks 5 and 6
|-
|2011
|Grace for Drowning (Kscope)
|-
|2009
| rowspan="14" |Stick Men
|Stick Men [A special edition]
|-
|2010
|Soup
|-
| rowspan="3" |2011
|Absalom(EP)
|-
|Live In Montevideo 2011
|-
|Live In Buenos Aires 2011
|-
|2012
|Open
|-
|2013
|Deep
|-
| rowspan="3" |2014
|Power Play
|-
|Unleashed: Live Improvs 2013
|-
|Supercollider: An Anthology 2010–2014
|-
|2015
|Midori: Live In Tokyo (Featuring David Cross)
|-
|2016
|Prog Noir
|-
| rowspan="2" |2017
|Roppongi – Live In Tokyo 2017 (Featuring Mel Collins)
|-
|KONNEKTED
|-
|2011
|Jakszyk, Fripp and Collins (with Levin and Harrison)
|A King Crimson ProjeKct A Scarcity of Miracles
|-
|2011
|Tony Levin, David Torn, Alan White
|Levin Torn White
|-
|2013
|Tony Levin, Marco Minnemann, Jordan Rudess
|Levin Minnemann Rudess
|-
|2015
|Anthony Curtis and Tony Levin
|Book of the Key
|-
|2019
|Keaggy, Marotta, and Levin
|The Bucket List
|}
 Jaune (1970) – Jean-Pierre Ferland
 Carly Simon (1971) – Carly Simon
 Diana in the Autumn Wind (1972) – Gap Mangione (arrangements by Chuck Mangione)
 Alive! (1972) – Chuck Mangione Quartet
 Don McLean (1972) – Don McLean
 Berlin (1973) – Lou Reed
 Over the Rainbow (1973) – Livingston Taylor
 The Roar of '74 (1973) – Buddy Rich
 Playin' Favorites (1973) – Don McLean
 Simba (Groove Merchant, 1974) – O'Donel Levy
 Still Crazy After All These Years (1975) – Paul Simon
 Welcome To My Nightmare (1975) – Alice Cooper
 Judith (1975) – Judy Collins
 Second Childhood (1976) – Phoebe Snow
 Goes to Hell (1976) – Alice Cooper
 Main Squeeze (1976) – Chuck Mangione
 Lace and Whiskey (1977) – Alice Cooper
 Never Letting Go (1977) – Phoebe Snow
 Singin'... (1977) – Melissa Manchester
 Ringo the 4th (1977) – Ringo Starr
 Watermark (1977) – Art Garfunkel
 Nested (1978) – Laura Nyro
 Blue Montreux (1978) – Arista All-Stars (Brecker Bros, Larry Coryell, etc.)
 Boys in the Trees (1978) – Carly Simon
 The Roches (1979) – The Roches
 Spy (1979) – Carly Simon
 Double Fantasy (1980) – John Lennon, Yoko Ono
 Me Myself I (1980) – Joan Armatrading
 Come Upstairs (1980) – Carly Simon
 Walk Under Ladders (1981) – Joan Armatrading
 Scissors Cut (1981) – Art Garfunkel
 Season of Glass (1981) – Yoko Ono
 It's Alright (I See Rainbows) (1982) – Yoko Ono
 Keep On Doing (1982) – The Roches
 Times of Our Lives (1982) – Judy Collins
 Scenario by Al Di Meola also with Phil Collins, Jan Hammer and Bill Bruford - (1983) 
 The Key (1983) – Joan Armatrading
 Hello Big Man (1983) – Carly Simon
 Milk and Honey (1984) – John Lennon, Yoko Ono
 Boys and Girls (1985) – Bryan Ferry
 Starpeace (1985) – Yoko Ono
 Strange Animal (1985) – Lawrence Gowan
 That's Why I'm Here (1985) – James Taylor
 Downtown (1985) – Marshall Crenshaw
 Rain Dogs (1985) – Tom Waits
 Cloud About Mercury (ECM, 1986) – David Torn
 The Big Picture (1986) – Michael W. Smith
 Premonition (1986) – Peter Frampton
 A Momentary Lapse of Reason (1987) – Pink Floyd
 Robbie Robertson (1987) – Robbie Robertson
 Great Dirty World (1987) – Lawrence Gowan
 Coming Around Again (1987) – Carly Simon
 Cher (1987) – Cher
 Sentimental Hygiene (1987) – Warren Zevon
 Safety in Numbers (1987) – David Van Tieghem
 Julia Fordham (1988) – Julia Fordham
 Tommy Page (1988) – Tommy Page
 Hide Your Heart (1988) – Bonnie Tyler
 Amnesia (1988) – Richard Thompson
 The Other Side of the Mirror (1989) – Stevie Nicks
 Maria McKee (1989) – Maria McKee
 Tim Finn (1989) – Tim Finn
N.Y.C. (1989) – Steps Ahead
The Natural Edge (1989) Pop Out World – David Wilcox
 Lost Brotherhood (1990) – Lawrence Gowan
 World Gone Strange (1991) – Andy Summers
 Stranger in This Town (1991) – Richie Sambora
 Discipline (1991) – Desmond Child
 New Moon Shine (1991) – James Taylor
 Matters of the Heart (1992) – Tracy Chapman
 Arkansas Traveler (1992) – Michelle Shocked
 Spin 1ne 2wo (1993) – Spin 1ne 2wo
 Flyer (1994) – Nanci Griffith
 Swamp Ophelia (1994) – Indigo Girls
 What's Inside (1995) – Joan Armatrading
 Dream Sequence (Psi, 1995–2003 [2003]) – Kenny Wheeler
 This Fire (1996) – Paula Cole
 Gravity (1996) – Jesse Cook
 The Last Dance of Mr. X (1997) – Andy Summers
 The Cappuccino Songs (1998) – Tanita Tikaram
 By 7:30 (1999) – Vonda Shepard
 Amen (1999) – Paula Cole
 Snowfall on the Sahara (1999) – Natalie Cole
 Aura (2001) – Asia
 My Ride's Here (2002) – Warren Zevon
 Chinatown (2002) – Vonda Shepard
 Heathen (2002) – David Bowie
 Afterglow (2003) – Sarah McLachlan
 Courage (2007) – Paula Cole
 L'Image 2.0 (2009) – L'Image
 Ithaca (2010) – Paula Cole
 The Next Day (2013) – David Bowie
 Raven (2013) – Paula Cole
 EVOLUTION (2014) Svjetlana Bukvich
 Music From An Expanded Universe (2014) – Leon Alvarado
 The Desired Effect (2015) – Brandon Flowers
 This Bright Red Feeling (2016) – Paula Cole
 Ballad of a Bad  Girl (album) (2021) – Kate McDonnell
 Troika (2022) - D'Virgilio, Morse, & Jennings

References

External links 

 

Male double-bassists
American session musicians
Art rock musicians
Chapman Stick players
Alice Cooper (band) members
King Crimson members
Peter Gabriel
Jewish American musicians
1946 births
Living people
People from Brookline, Massachusetts
Narada Productions artists
American bloggers
People from Woodstock, New York
Jewish rock musicians
American rock bass guitarists
American jazz double-bassists
American jazz bass guitarists
American male bass guitarists
20th-century American guitarists
21st-century American guitarists
Progressive rock musicians
Progressive rock bass guitarists
Jazz musicians from New York (state)
Bozzio Levin Stevens members
Liquid Tension Experiment members
Bruford Levin Upper Extremities members
Stick Men (prog band) members
Jazz musicians from Massachusetts
American male bloggers
21st-century double-bassists
American male jazz musicians
Steps Ahead members
White Elephant Orchestra members
HoBoLeMa members
Jewish heavy metal musicians
Jewish jazz musicians